The Last Chance Store was built in 1857 along the Santa Fe Trail at Council Grove, Kansas. Located where the trail crossed the Neosho River, it was the last store in the settlement before the river. It was operated by Tom Hill as a trading post, as well as a post office and a polling place. The structure is constructed of local limestone, irregularly course, with a gable room and some quoining at the corners. The building marks a transition from the Frontier style of construction to the Prairie Vernacular style.

It was placed on the National Register of Historic Places on June 21, 1971. The store contributes to the National Historic Landmark Council Grove Historic District.

References

External links

Commercial buildings on the National Register of Historic Places in Kansas
Commercial buildings completed in 1857
Buildings and structures in Morris County, Kansas
Historic American Buildings Survey in Kansas
National Register of Historic Places in Morris County, Kansas
Individually listed contributing properties to historic districts on the National Register in Kansas
1857 establishments in Kansas Territory
Vernacular architecture in the United States
Santa Fe Trail